Aralvaimozhi  is a panchayat town in Kanniyakumari District  in the state of Tamil Nadu, India. It is a small town situated in southern India. The town was earlier called as Aramboly during colonial period.

History
Aralvaimozhi pass was a strategically important gap or mountain pass in the southernmost end of Western Ghats. It connected erstwhile Travancore with Madras Presidency. Many of the invasions faced by the Chera and the successor kingdoms came via this ghat.

The name "Aral" was derived from the fort built and maintained by the rulers of Venad and later by the kingdom of Travancore to defend the kingdom from invasions from the east regions. It is also said that Aralvaimozhi means whispering wind. The whistling sound of wind in the region might have led to such a name.

Aralvaimozhi Fort was one of the most important forts of Travancore. It was constructed around 1740 by Eustachius De Lannoy along with Udayagiri Fort, Vattakottai Fort and Travancore lines. The fort was captured by the English East India Company in 1809 from the soldiers loyal to Velu Thampi Dalawa. The remains of the fort can be seen near railway station, but neglected by both railway and archeology departments.

Culture
During the invasion of Sultan Alauddin Khilji of Delhi in 1311 AD by Malik Kapoor, Meenakshi Amman and Sundareeswarar were brought from Madurai to Venadu and hid in Parakodi Kandan Shasta temple near Aralvaaimozhi. Until 1368, Meenakshi Amman remained in Aralvaimozhi. From there she was taken back to Madurai.

Economy
Its pincode is 629301. Muppandal Wind Farm is located in Aralvaimozhi Town Panchayat.  This farm is the largest in Asia and supplies the villagers with electricity for their needs. It is well known for being the greatest source of wind energy in Asia.

Poigai Dam, constructed in the year 2000 is serving water for irrigation purposes around the area. For the first time the dam was completely filled with water in 5 nov 2021 making it a wonderful place to visit.

Wind energy
The 1,500 megawatts (MW) Muppandal wind farm is the country's largest onshore wind farm which is the Asia's second largest windfarm. The project features a large number of wind turbines of varying sizes from 200 kilowatts (KW) to 1650KW.

Transportation
Railway station spelled "Aralvaimozhi", with station code AAY is situated here. It is connecting many employees of ISRO_ Mahendragiri campus.

Gallery

See also
 Aryankavu pass
 Palakkad Gap

References

External links
News about heritage grinding stone found at Aralvaimozhi - reported in The Hindu
Poigai Dam - In government's Water Resources Information System - Wiki

Cities and towns in Kanyakumari district
Kanyakumari
Tourism in Tamil Nadu